Black Duck Cove may refer to:
Black Duck Cove, Great Northern Peninsula, Newfoundland and Labrador
Black Duck Cove, Notre Dame Bay, Newfoundland and Labrador
Black Duck Cove, Trinity Bay, Newfoundland and Labrador